The UNC Asheville Bulldogs are the athletic teams that represent the University of North Carolina at Asheville (UNCA). They participate in Division I of the NCAA and are a member of the Big South Conference. UNCA fields varsity teams in 12 sports, 6 for men and 6 for women.

In 1984, the UNCA women's basketball team won the NAIA national championship.

Sports teams
UNCA competes in the NCAA in the following sports:

Men's Sports
Baseball
Basketball
Cross Country
Soccer
Tennis
Track and Field

Women's Sports
Basketball
Cross Country
Golf
Soccer
Swimming *
Tennis
Track and Field
Volleyball
 * = The swimming team competes as a member of the Coastal Collegiate Sports Association.

Athletic facilities
 Crowne Plaza Tennis Center: Home of UNCA tennis.
 Greenwood Baseball Field: Completed in the spring of 1988, home of UNCA baseball. Capacity for 300 people.
 Greenwood Soccer Field: Opened in 1989, capacity for 1,000 people. Home of UNCA soccer.
 Kimmel Arena: Home of UNCA basketball and volleyball from 2011, replaces the smaller Justice Center. Holds 3,400 people.
 Karl Straus Track: Home of UNCA's track and field programs.

Championships

Baseball
 Big South tournament (1): 2006

Men's basketball
 Big South regular season (8): 1997, 1998, 2002 (shared with Winthrop), 2008 (shared with Winthrop), 2012, 2017, 2018, 2023
 Big South tournament (6): 1989, 2003, 2011, 2012, 2016, 2023

UNC Asheville men's basketball has now won at least 15 games in a season for a league-record 11 consecutive seasons. UNC Asheville's 11th straight 15 or more win season allowed the Bulldogs to pass the old mark of 10 it shared with Winthrop (1998-08). UNC Asheville has won 15 or more games every year since the 2007–08 season.

Women's basketball

 NAIA National Champions (1): 1984
 Big South tournament (3): 2007, 2016, 2017
 Big South regular season (1): 2016

Men's soccer
 Big South regular season (1): 2001

Women's soccer
 Big South regular season (2): 2004, 2005
 Big South tournament (2): 1995, 2006

Women's volleyball
 National Invitational Volleyball Championship (NIVC) champions (1): 1991
 Big South regular season (5): 1990, 1991 (shared), 1992, 2002, 2009
 Big South tournament (2): 1991, 1992

References